Elections to Knowsley Metropolitan Borough Council were held on 4 May 2006.  One third of the council was up for election and the Labour Party kept overall control of the council.

After the election, the composition of the council was:
Labour 51
Liberal Democrat 12

Election result

Three Labour councillors were uncontested.

Ward results

External links
Results on council site

2006
2006 English local elections
2000s in Merseyside